Rajae Maouane (born 3 July 1989) is a Belgian politician who serves as co-president of Ecolo.

Biography 
Rajae Maouane was born on 3 July 1989 in Uccle to a family of Moroccan Belgians. Her father was a laborer and her mother was a homemaker. Maouane completed her secondary studies in Laeken was passionate about football.

During her studies at the Institut supérieur for social training and communications, Maouane worked as an press secretary and project manager for the Brussels Intercommunal Transport Company. After her university studies in communications, Maouane worked for the satirical newspaper Pan.

Political life 
Maouane's first contacts with the political sphere began when she served as for the press service for Ecolo. From 2013 to 2018, Maouane served as an assistant to Sarah Turine, échevin of Molenbeek-Saint-Jean, where she also served as political co-secretary.

Since 2016, Maouane has served as the co-president for the Brussels regional branch of Ecolo. Additionally, she was elected to the Communal Council of Molenbeek in December 2018 and to the Brussels-Capital Region Parliament in the 2019 Belgian regional elections. As a member of the Brussels Regional Parliament, Maouane also has a seat in the Parliament of the French Community of Belgium.

For the 2019 Brussels regional elections, Maouane was designated fourth on the Ecolo party list. Maouane was elected to the fourth spot on the list with 4,297 votes.

At the party's general assembly in Namur, Maouane and Nollet received 92% of votes. Upon her election as co-president, she resigned her posts in the Brussels and French Community Parliaments.

Controversy 
in 2021, Maouane was accused of inciting antisemitism after sharing a picture and song on Instagram displaying a Palestinian fighter with a slingshot. The accompanying song, “Wein Al Malayeen”, asks the Arab nations unite against Israel. Maouane contested the accusation, claiming the post was a call for justice and an end to the conflict between Israel and the Palestinians.

References

External links 
 Rajae Maouane on Ecolo's official site

Ecolo politicians
Members of the Parliament of the Brussels-Capital Region
1989 births
People from Uccle
Members of the Parliament of the French Community
Living people